Samuel Edward Shrimski (1828 – 25 June 1902) was a 19th-century Member of Parliament and then a Member of the Legislative Council from Otago, New Zealand.

Early life
He was born in Poznań, Prussia, where he received his initial education. He went to London in 1847, where he stayed for 12 years. Shrimski emigrated to Melbourne in 1859 and came to New Zealand in 1861. He became a naturalized citizen in 1863. He married Deborah Neumegen at the Dunedin Synagogue on 28 June 1865. She was the niece of Leopold Neumegen, a Jewish schoolmaster.

Political career

Shrimski was the government land auctioneer in Oamaru. He unsuccessfully ran for Mayor of Oamaru in 1870, 1871, and 1872, before finally succeeding in 1874. He was defeated in 1875.

Shrimski contested the 1876 election in the  electorate. Waitaki was first established in the 1870 Electoral Redistribution. For the 1876 election, it became a two-member electorate. Four candidates put their names forward. Steward and Joseph O'Meagher contested the election as abolitionists (i.e. they were in favour of abolishing the provincial government), while Thomas William Hislop and Shrimski were provincialists (i.e. they favoured the retention of provincial government). The provincialists won the election by quite some margin, and both became members of parliament for the first time.

The resulting  was won by George Jones, who served alongside Shrimski until 1881.

In the 1884 general election, he defeated Viscount Reidhaven (who later became the Earl of Seafield when he succeeded his father).

He was appointed to the Legislative Council on 15 May 1885, one of an unprecedented nine appointments made by the Stout–Vogel Ministry in 1885, which inflated the council's membership to 54. He held that role until he died in 1902.

In Oamaru, he was a member of educational and philanthropic institutions. He held the offices of chairman of the educational board of North Otago, treasurer of the hospital board, and vice-president of the Otago branch of the Anglo-Jewish Association.

Death
Shrimski moved to Auckland in 1900 to be closer to other family members. After having been ill for five weeks, he died at his residence in Lower Symonds Street, Auckland, on 25 June 1902. He is buried at Waikumete Cemetery. He was survived by his wife Deborah Shrimski.

Notes

References

|- 

1828 births
1902 deaths
Members of the New Zealand House of Representatives
Members of the New Zealand Legislative Council
New Zealand Jews
New Zealand people of Polish-Jewish descent
Mayors of Oamaru
Polish emigrants to New Zealand
Burials at Waikumete Cemetery
New Zealand MPs for South Island electorates
19th-century New Zealand politicians
Naturalised citizens of New Zealand